The First Crusade is the only studio album by the Icelandic band Jakobínarína. It was released on October 1, 2007 on 12 Tónar in Europe, and on Regal/EMI in the UK. The First Crusade was released on CD  and  LP. The original track listing listed "I've Got A Date With My Television" and "So, Spit Me In The Eye" as "(I've Got A Date With) My Television" and "Spit Me In The Eye". Jakobinarina disbanded shortly after the album's release on March 8, 2008. "I'm a Villain" featured as soundtrack in EA Sports game, FIFA 09.

Track listing
 "Monday I'm In Vain" – 3:04
 "His Lyrics Are Disastrous" – 2:17
 "17" – 2:43
 "Jesus" – 2:46
 "Call For Advice" – 4:13
 "End Of Transmission No.6" – 1:32
 "Sleeping In Seattle" – 2:24
 "I've Got A Date With My Television" – 2:51
 "This Is An Advertisement" – 4:01
 "I'm A Villain" – 2:58
 "Nice Guys Don't Play Good Music" – 3:08
 "So, Spit Me In The Eye" – 5:29

Personnel
 Gunnar Ragnarsson – vocals
 Hallberg Daði Hallbergsson – guitar and backing vocals
 Ágúst Fannar Ásgeirsson – keyboard
 Björgvin Ingi Pétursson – bass
 Heimir Gestur Valdimarsson – guitar
 Sigurður Möller Sívertsen – drums
 Marteinn Knaran Ómarsson – piano on "Jesus"
 Eric Yip, Collette Hazen, Jack Duckett and Nick Fry – Strings on "I've Got A Date With My Television, "This Is An Advertisement", "I'm A Villain", "Nice Guys Don't Play Good Music" and "So, Spit Me In The Eye"
 Stan Kybert – producer
 Mike Crossley – mixer
 Roy Merchant and Jim Anderson – engineers

References

External links
 

2007 albums
Jakobínarína albums